Savran is a village in the Gölbaşı District, Adıyaman Province, Turkey. Its population is 550 (2021).

The hamlets of Otluk and Tepelik are attached to the village.

References

Villages in Gölbaşı District, Adıyaman Province